Joel Arthur Glucksman (born February 14, 1949) is an American Olympic saber  fencer.

Early and personal life
Glucksman was born in New York City, and is Jewish. He later lived on the Upper West Side in Manhattan, New York.

Fencing career
Glucksman attended Columbia University, where he fenced for the Columbia Lions fencing team.  He graduated in 1970.

He fenced with the New York Fencers Club. Glucksman won a silver medal in individual saber at the 1977 Maccabiah Games.

In May 1982, his article "In Fencing you Get in Touch with Yourself as well as Your Opponent" was published by Sports Illustrated.

Glucksman competed on  behalf of the United States in the team sabre event at the 1984 Summer Olympics in Los Angeles at the age of 35.

Glucksman worked as an assistant fencing coach, physical education teacher, and administrator at Columbia University, and as fencing coach for the Brooklyn College men's fencing team and at The Browning School. He also became a documentary filmmaker.

References

External links
 

1949 births
Living people
American male sabre fencers
Olympic fencers of the United States
Fencers at the 1984 Summer Olympics
Sportspeople from New York City
Columbia University alumni
Jewish American sportspeople
Jewish male sabre fencers
Maccabiah Games medalists in fencing
Maccabiah Games silver medalists for the United States
Competitors at the 1977 Maccabiah Games
Film directors from New York City
People from the Upper West Side
Brooklyn College faculty
Columbia Lions fencers
21st-century American Jews